Shekerpur Union is a union in the Naogaon Sadar upazila of Naogaon district in the Rajshahi division of Bangladesh.

References 

Unions of Naogaon District